Sabine Wagner is a paralympic athlete from Germany competing mainly in category T46 sprint events.

Sabine has competed at two Paralympics.  Her first in 2000 saw her finish second behind American Shea Cowart in both the 100m and 200m.  In her second games in 2004 she failed to match this performance missing out on the medals in the 100m, 200m and long jump.

References

External links
 

Paralympic athletes of Germany
Athletes (track and field) at the 2000 Summer Paralympics
Athletes (track and field) at the 2004 Summer Paralympics
Paralympic silver medalists for Germany
Living people
Medalists at the 2000 Summer Paralympics
Year of birth missing (living people)
Paralympic medalists in athletics (track and field)
German female sprinters
Sprinters with limb difference
Paralympic sprinters